Valerie Davey (born Valerie Corbett; 16 April 1940) is a former Labour Member of Parliament (MP) for Bristol West in England.

Early life
Born in Surrey, Davey studied theology and history at the University of Birmingham and gained a PGCE at the Institute of Education in 1963. She then gained an MA in Theology, specialising in New Testament textual criticism. Entering work, she taught near Wolverhampton at the Regis Comprehensive School (now the King's Church of England School) on Regis Road in Tettenhall. After her marriage, she moved to Tanzania and taught at the Ilboru Secondary School on Ilboru Road in Arusha. Davey moved to Bristol in 1968, and concentrated on her children. She taught for one year Religious studies A level at South Gloucestershire and Stroud College. She was an Avon County Council councillor from 1981 until the county's abolition in 1996 and Labour group leader from 1992. Davey was also a governor of various schools and of Bristol Polytechnic (now the UWE).

Parliamentary career
She won the three-way marginal seat of Bristol West at the 1997 general election, displacing the Conservative cabinet minister William Waldegrave, but lost it to the Liberal Democrat Stephen Williams at the 2005 general election.

In Parliament, she was a member of the House of Commons Education & Skills Committee.

Personal life
She married Graham Davey in 1966 in Weston-super-Mare. They have a son and two daughters.

External links 
 
 Aristole profile from The Guardian
 They Work For You
 Honorary degree from UWE in November 2005 after she lost her seat

1940 births
Politics of Bristol
Conservative Party (UK) MPs for English constituencies
People from Sutton, London
Alumni of the UCL Institute of Education
Councillors in South West England
Female members of the Parliament of the United Kingdom for English constituencies
UK MPs 1997–2001
UK MPs 2001–2005
People associated with the University of the West of England, Bristol
Living people
Alumni of the University of Birmingham
British expatriates in Tanzania
Members of Parliament for Bristol
20th-century British women politicians
21st-century British women politicians
20th-century English women
20th-century English people
21st-century English women
21st-century English people
Women councillors in England